The 1987 European Baseball Championship was held in Spain and was won by the Netherlands. Italy finished as runner-up.

Standings

References
(NL) European Championship Archive at honkbalsite

European Baseball Championship
European Baseball Championship
1987
1987 in Spanish sport